Cuncunani (possibly from Aymara kunkuna a plant (Distichia muscoides), -ni a suffix to indicate ownership, "the one with kunkuna") is a mountain in the Vilcanota mountain range in the Andes of Peru, about  high. It is situated in the Puno Region, Carabaya Province, Corani District. Cuncunani lies in the east of the large glaciated area of Quelccaya (Quechua for "snow plain") and southeast of Cunorana.

References

Mountains of Puno Region
Mountains of Peru